The Humboldt-Viadrina School of Governance was a higher education school in Berlin, Germany from 2003 to 2014, established through a unique partnership between two public universities: Viadrina European University in Frankfurt (Oder) and the Humboldt University of Berlin, one of Berlin's oldest universities. Dr. Gesine Schwan, a two-time presidential nominee of the Social Democratic Party of Germany (SPD) was the founder and president of the school. The School aimed to be a forum that contributes to the development of intelligent solutions for current social problems.

Academic programs 

The School offered two master's programs, both consisting of part-time on-campus sessions in Berlin and distance learning online. The degree programs continue to be administered by the European University Viadrina Frankfurt (Oder). Former and current students receive a degree from both the Humboldt University Berlin and Viadrina University.

Admissions 

A selection committee composed of representatives from both universities reviewed all the applications received.

Resources 

The Humboldt-Viadrina building included a library that served as an interdisciplinary resource on the subject of civil society, philanthropy and the nonprofit sector.

External Links & References 
 http://www.humboldt-viadrina.org/

Defunct universities and colleges in Germany
2014 disestablishments in Germany
2003 establishments in Germany